Siédougou is a town in the Manni Department of Gnagna Province in eastern Burkina Faso. The town has a population of 2,938.

References

External links
Satellite map at Maplandia.com

Populated places in the Est Region (Burkina Faso)
Gnagna Province